Braintree station is an intermodal transit station in Braintree, Massachusetts. It serves the MBTA's Red Line and the MBTA Commuter Rail Old Colony Lines as well as MBTA buses.

It is located at Ivory and Union Streets. The tracks of the Red Line and commuter rail lines are all parallel to one another, their platforms are offset; the commuter rail platform is located north of Union Street, while the Red Line platform is south of the street. The station features a large park and ride garage, with space for 1,322 automobiles. Braintree is fully accessible on all modes.

Station layout

The two Red Line tracks and two commuter rail tracks run parallel approximately north-south on an embankment through the station site, with the Red Line tracks on the west. The station has two island platforms. The Red Line platform is located south of Union Street, with the fare lobby under the platform. Tail tracks continue south to a four-track storage yard, Caddigan Yard. The three-level parking garage is located east of the Red Line platform.

The commuter rail platform, an -long high-level platform, is located north of Union Street. Access to the platform is at its south end, with a pedestrian level crossing of the eastern track. Ramps lead to Union Street, the busway, and the Red Line lobby. A five-track freight yard used by CSX and the Fore River Railroad is located east of the commuter rail platform. Braintree station is accessible on all modes.

History

Previous stations

The Old Colony Railroad had its Braintree station at Braintree Square at the junction with the South Shore Railroad, with South Braintree station at Pearl Street where the lines to Plymouth and to Middleborough split. The New York, New Haven and Hartford Railroad attempted to remove seven grade crossings in Quincy and Braintree in 1908, but met resistance from the towns. Another plan in 1913 to build road bridges at School, Elm, and River streets and an underpass at Union Street also fell through. 

The School Street crossing was eliminated by the construction of Church Street in 1936, and a Union Street underpass was built in 1937. Old Colony Division service ended on June 30, 1959, as the Southeast Expressway was completed. Expressway construction had included a bridge for Elm Street, while River Street was severed. The former Braintree and South Braintree stations, the latter of which had been reused by the railroad's maintenance of way department, were both demolished around 1971 during Red Line construction.

MBTA station

A groundbreaking ceremony for Braintree station was held on July 13, 1977. The station opened on March 22, 1980, for Red Line service. Between 1984 and 1988, the Cape Cod and Hyannis Railroad operated a state-subsidized seasonal weekend service from Braintree to Hyannis, Massachusetts, on Cape Cod. Commuter rail service began on September 26, 1997, when the Old Colony Lines re-opened; the Pearl Street grade crossing was replaced with a railroad bridge during construction. The station has been accessible since at least 1989.

From 1980 to 2007, a double entry fare and single exit fare were charged at Braintree and Quincy Adams when leaving the subway. The extra fares were discontinued as part of a fare increase and service change on January 1, 2007. Similar charges existed until 1980 on the inner stations on the Braintree Branch.

During service disruptions, Braintree can serve as the terminal for the Old Colony Lines and the Greenbush Line.

Garage repairs
Although built to last 50 years, the parking garage at Braintree began suffering concrete damage due to water leakage and ill-fitting structural elements. Repairs were performed to the Quincy Adams and Braintree garages in the mid 1990s. In 2015, the MBTA began a $4.4 million project to address urgent structural issues with the two garages, though full repair or replacement was still needed. Further construction on the Braintree garage took place in 2016. The deteriorated footbridge between the garage and station was closed in February 2017. \

The garage is being fully renovated from May 2018 through 2021 at a cost of $29 million; the station and garage were originally planned to remain open during the whole project. The work includes a canopy over the ramp to the commuter rail platform, and a canopy to replace the former footbridge. 400 garage spaces closed on February 10, 2020, to allow the project to be completed by June 2021 rather than December 2021. The garage was closed from October 5, 2020, to April 20, 2021, when part of the garage reopened.

References

External links

MBTA - Braintree
MBTA - South Shore Garages

Red Line (MBTA) stations
Railway stations in Norfolk County, Massachusetts
Stations along Old Colony Railroad lines
Railway stations in the United States opened in 1980
MBTA Commuter Rail stations in Norfolk County, Massachusetts
1980 establishments in Massachusetts
Buildings and structures in Braintree, Massachusetts
Transportation in Braintree, Massachusetts